Gav Borj (also Romanized as Gāv Borj and Kāv Borj) is a village in Pain Velayat Rural District, Razaviyeh District, Mashhad County, Razavi Khorasan Province, Iran. At the 2006 census, its population was 785, in 169 families.

References 

Populated places in Mashhad County